Scutiger is a genus of toads in the family Megophryidae. Common name lazy toads has been coined for them. They occur in China, Burma, Nepal, and northern India in high-altitude habitats. Most are endemic to China.

Evolution
A 2017 molecular phylogenetic study found that Scutiger originated in Paleo-Tibet during the Oligocene.

Species
The following species are recognised in the genus Scutiger:
 Scutiger adungensis Dubois, 1979 – Adung lazy toad
 Scutiger bhutanensis Delorme and Dubois, 2001
 Scutiger boulengeri (Bedriaga, 1898) – Boulenger's lazy toad, Xizang alpine toad, Himalayan stream frog 
 Scutiger brevipes (Liu, 1950)
 Scutiger chintingensis Liu and Hu, 1960 – Chinting lazy toad, Chinting alpine toad
 Scutiger ghunsa Khatiwada, Shu, Subedi, Wang, Ohler, Cannatella, Xie, and Jiang, 2019 – Ghunsa high altitude toad
 Scutiger glandulatus (Liu, 1950) – Hopachai lazy toad, chest gland cat-eyed toad 
 Scutiger gongshanensis Yang and Su, 1979 – Gongshan lazy toad, Gongshan cat-eyed toad 
 Scutiger jiulongensis Fei, Ye, and Jiang, 1995 – Jiulong cat-eyed toad
 Scutiger liupanensis Huang, 1985 – Liupan lazy toad, Liupan alpine toad
 Scutiger maculatus (Liu, 1950) – spotted lazy toad, piebald alpine toad 
 Scutiger mammatus (Günther, 1896) – Tungsolo lazy toad 
 Scutiger muliensis Fei and Ye, 1986 – Muli cat-eyed toad 
 Scutiger nepalensis Dubois, 1974 – Nepal lazy toad, mountain pelobatid toad, Asiatic spadefoot toad 
 Scutiger ningshanensis Fang, 1985 – Ningshan lazy toad, Ningshan alpine toad
 Scutiger nyingchiensis Fei, 1977 – Nyingchi lazy toad, Ladakh pelobatid toad, Nyingshi alpine toad
 Scutiger occidentalis Dubois, 1978 – Ladakh high altitude toad
 Scutiger pingwuensis Liu and Tian, 1978 – Pingwu lazy toad, Pingwu alpine toad 
 Scutiger sikimmensis (Blyth, 1855) – Sikkim lazy toad, Sikkim high altitude toad, Blyth's short-limbed frog
 Scutiger spinosus Jiang, Wang, Li, and Che, 2016 – spiny lazy toad
 Scutiger tengchongensis Yang & Huang, 2019
 Scutiger tuberculatus Liu and Fei, 1979 – bumpy lazy toad, round-tubercled cat-eyed toad 
 Scutiger wanglangensis Ye and Fei, 2007 – Wanglang alpine toad
 Scutiger wuguanfui Jiang, Rao, Yuan, Wang, Li, Hou, Che, and Che, 2012 – Wu's lazy toad, Medog lazy toad

Endemic ranges
Many Scutiger species are endemic to highly restricted geographical areas in the Eastern Himalayas. The ranges often overlap with those of Oreolalax species.

Ningxia, China
 Scutiger liupanensis: Liupanshan National Nature Reserve, Jingyuan County, Ningxia Hui Autonomous Region, China
Shaanxi, China
 Scutiger ningshanensis: Ningshan County, Shaanxi
Sichuan, China
 Scutiger brevipes: Dawu County, Sichuan
 Scutiger chintingensis: Mount Emei area, Sichuan
 Scutiger jiulongensis: Jiulong County, Sichuan
 Scutiger maculatus: Garze, Sichuan and Jiangda, Tibet
 Scutiger muliensis: Muli County, Sichuan
 Scutiger pingwuensis: Pingwu County, Sichuan
 Scutiger wanglangensis: Sichuan
Yunnan, China
 Scutiger gongshanensis: Gongshan County, Yunnan
Tibet
 Scutiger maculatus: Garze, Sichuan and Jiangda, Tibet
 Scutiger nyingchiensis: Nyingchi Prefecture, Tibet
 Scutiger spinosus: Medog County, Tibet and Tawang District, Arunachal Pradesh
 Scutiger wuguanfui: Medog County, Tibet
Bhutan
 Scutiger bhutanensis: Bhutan
Sikkim, India
 Scutiger sikimmensis: Sikkim, India

References

Further reading
Fu, J., et al. (1997). Phylogeny of genus Scutiger (Amphibia: Megophryidae): a re-evaluation. Asiatic Herpetol. Res 7, 32–37.

 
Amphibian genera
Frogs of Asia
Megophryidae
Taxa named by William Theobald
Taxonomy articles created by Polbot